Kevin J. Miyazaki is a graphic designer, photographer, and educator based in Milwaukee, Wisconsin. His work has been published in several nationally circulated magazines. He attended Drake University in Des Moines, Iowa, where he earned his bachelor's degree in 1990. Miyazaki typically explores themes of family history and identity in his art work through lenses of place and memory.

Early life and career 
Miyazaki began his career as a staff photographer at The Cincinnati Enquirer in 1997. In 1998 he became the photo editor at Cincinnati magazine. He has been a regular contributor to Milwaukee Magazine since the early 2000s. Other publication credits include Time, Newsweek, Forbes, Fortune, National Geographic Traveler, GQ, The New York Times, Food & Wine, and numerous others. He is represented by Redux Pictures. Miyazaki has accumulated a number of successes in his adult life. He has founded a number of web-based venues for other upcoming artists to showcase their pieces.

Contributions 
He has founded a number of web-based venues for other up-and-coming artists to showcase their pieces with the exception of plate.com. Plate.com is an interactive gallery site devoted to artisanal cuisine snapshots utilized commercially to promote restaurants, with over 150 restaurants featured on his interactive website. Another Miyazaki contribution is Collectdotgive.com, a website founded in December 2009. Collect.give enables artists to submit limited edition photographs, with the intention of raising money and awareness for selected charity organizations. His latest addition to the internet is an experimental and simplistic approach to online space. Tinytinygroupshow.com is a website dedicated for groups of artists that wish to contribute pieces on a common theme.

Over the years, Miyazaki has had his art showcased in a wide variety of well-established web-based and print organizations. Most commonly his work can be found in Travel + Leisure, The New York Times, and Midwest Living; however, it is not uncommon to find additional published photos of his in publications such as Bon Appétit, Food & Wine, Martha Stewart Living, and Sunset.

 Miyazaki's art photos have been featured in galleries all over the United States, including Seattle, San Francisco, New Jersey, and New York City. He has also received several honors for his work, including being a recipient of the Mary L. Nohl Fund Fellowship, and being hosted as an artist in residence at the Center for Photography at Woodstock.

List of major exhibitions and projects:
 Three Men
 Echo
 Perimeter
 Camp Home
 Within Reach 
 As Seen
 Fast Food
 Sky Above

References

Year of birth missing (living people)
Artists from Milwaukee
Drake University alumni
American photographers
Living people